Catoxophylla cyanaugus is a moth in the family Cossidae, and the only species in the genus Catoxophylla. It is found in Australia, where it has been recorded from Western Australia.

References

Natural History Museum Lepidoptera generic names catalog

Zeuzerinae